Gao E (born November 7, 1962 in Shenyang, Liaoning) is a female Chinese sports shooter who won two Olympic bronze medals, at the 2000 Summer Olympics and the 2004 Summer Olympics.

Olympic results

External links
 
 

1962 births
Living people
Olympic bronze medalists for China
Olympic shooters of China
Shooters at the 1988 Summer Olympics
Shooters at the 1996 Summer Olympics
Shooters at the 2000 Summer Olympics
Shooters at the 2004 Summer Olympics
Trap and double trap shooters
Asian Games medalists in shooting
Olympic medalists in shooting
Sport shooters from Shenyang
Medalists at the 2004 Summer Olympics
Shooters at the 1994 Asian Games
Shooters at the 1998 Asian Games
Shooters at the 2002 Asian Games
Shooters at the 2010 Asian Games
Chinese female sport shooters
Medalists at the 2000 Summer Olympics
Asian Games gold medalists for China
Asian Games silver medalists for China
Medalists at the 1994 Asian Games
Medalists at the 1998 Asian Games
Medalists at the 2002 Asian Games
Medalists at the 2010 Asian Games
20th-century Chinese women
21st-century Chinese women